These are the Billboard magazine Hot Dance Airplay number one hits of 2008. (Note: Billboard publishes charts with an issue date approximately 7–10 days in advance).

See also
2008 in music
List of number-one dance singles of 2008 (U.S.)

References

United States Dance Airplay
2008
2008 in American music